Manziarly is a surname. Notable people with the surname include:

 Constanze Manziarly (1920–1945), Adolf Hitler's cook
 Marcelle de Manziarly (1899–1989), French pianist, music educator, conductor, and composer